Angoothi is a 1943 Bollywood film directed by Bibhuti Mitra and starring Ashok Kumar.

References

External links
 

1943 films
1940s Hindi-language films
Indian black-and-white films